() is the 40th studio album by famous Italian singer and actor Adriano Celentano, issued November 10, 2000 by label MSI Music Distribution.

Track listing

Charts

Weekly charts

Year-end charts

See also
 List of best-selling albums in Italy

References

External links
 
  
  

Adriano Celentano albums
2000 albums